DAS Handling Limited,  is an airport ground handling service company in Uganda. It is the second-largest ground handling company at Entebbe International Airport, Uganda's largest civilian and military airport, behind market leader Entebbe Handling Services.

Location
The company maintains its corporate headquarters at Sebugwawo Drive, Entebbe International Airport, Entebbe, Uganda. The coordinates of the headquarters of DAS Handling Limited are:0°02'24.0"N, 32°27'03.0"E (Latitude:0.040000; Longitude:32.450833).

Overview
DAS Handling Limited is a ground services provider at Entebbe International Airport, Uganda's largest and busiest civilian and military airport, behind market leader, Entebbe Handling Services. The company handles several international airlines including:

 Fastjet
 Air Tanzania
 Kenya Airways
 RwandAir
 Fly-SAX
 Precision Air
 Jambojet
 Fly Airlink
 Saudia

History
The company was formed in 1996, as the self-handling ground unit for the aircraft group Dairo Air Services. In 2002, DAS Handling Limited was granted a renewable, five-year, commercial operator's license. This authorization allowed the company to compete for services to other airlines outside its parent group. In May 2014, the company attained ACC3/RA3 European Union ground handling certification. In August 2014, DAS Handling Limited successfully completed the International Air Transport Association (IATA) Safety Audit for Ground Operations (ISAGO). Following that successful audit, the company became one of 154 ground service providers worldwide who had successfully registered under the IATA ISAGO programme at that time.

References

External links
 Profile of DAS Handling Limited At Centre For Aviation (CAPA)
 DAS Air Cargo Logistics And Transportation Services

Aircraft ground handling companies
Aviation companies of Uganda
Transport companies established in 1996
1996 establishments in Uganda
Dairo Air Services